The 1995–96 NBA season was the 8th season for the Charlotte Hornets in the National Basketball Association. During the off-season, the Hornets re-acquired former guard Kendall Gill from the Seattle SuperSonics. On the first day of the regular season, which began on November 3, the Hornets acquired Glen Rice, Matt Geiger and second-year guard Khalid Reeves from the Miami Heat. The Hornets got off to a slow start losing eight of their first eleven games, but played around .500 as the season progressed. In January, they traded Gill and Reeves to the New Jersey Nets in exchange for Kenny Anderson, who became the team's starting point guard, while Muggsy Bogues sat out with a knee injury that only limited him to just six games. Scott Burrell was also out for the remainder of the season with a shoulder injury after only playing just 20 games.

The Hornets continued to play around .500, holding a 22–24 record at the All-Star break, and finishing sixth in the Central Division with a 41–41 record, missing the Playoffs by finishing just one game behind the 8th-seeded Miami Heat. The Hornets, along with the Indiana Pacers, were the only two teams in the league to defeat the Chicago Bulls on the road during their historic 72–10 season, as the Hornets defeated the Bulls, 98–97 at the United Center on April 8, 1996.

Rice led the team in scoring averaging 21.6 points per game, and was selected to play in the 1996 NBA All-Star Game. In addition, Larry Johnson averaged 20.5 points, 8.4 rebounds and 4.4 assists per game, while sixth man Dell Curry provided the team with 14.5 points per game, Burrell contributed 13.2 points, 4.9 rebounds and 1.4 steals per game, and Geiger provided with 11.2 points and 8.4 rebounds per game. The Hornets led the NBA in home-game attendance for the seventh time in their eight-year history.

Following the season, Johnson was traded to the New York Knicks, while Anderson signed as a free agent with the Portland Trail Blazers, Robert Parish signed with the Chicago Bulls, Michael Adams retired, and head coach Allan Bristow resigned after five seasons with the franchise.

NBA Draft

Roster

Regular season

Season standings

Record vs. opponents

Game log

Player statistics

Awards and records

Transactions
 June 24, 1995

Lost Kenny Gattison to the Vancouver Grizzlies in the NBA expansion draft.
 June 27, 1995

Traded Hersey Hawkins and David Wingate to the Seattle SuperSonics for Kendall Gill.
 September 27, 1995

Signed Rafael Addison as an unrestricted free agent.
 October 3, 1995

Signed Pete Myers as an unrestricted free agent.
 October 4, 1995

Signed Corey Beck as a free agent.

Signed Negele Knight as an unrestricted free agent.
 October 24, 1995

Waived Negele Knight.
 November 2, 1995

Waived Corey Beck.
 November 3, 1995

Traded LeRon Ellis, Alonzo Mourning and Pete Myers to the Miami Heat for Matt Geiger, Khalid Reeves, Glen Rice and a 1996 1st round draft pick (Tony Delk was later selected).
 November 6, 1995

Waived Joe Wolf.
 December 23, 1995

Signed Corey Beck to a contract for the rest of the season.
 January 3, 1996

Waived Greg Sutton.
 January 5, 1996

Waived Corey Beck.
 January 19, 1996

Traded Kendall Gill and Khalid Reeves to the New Jersey Nets for Kenny Anderson and Gerald Glass.
 January 22, 1996

Signed Anthony Goldwire to a 10-day contract.
 January 31, 1996

Signed Anthony Goldwire to a contract for the rest of the season.
 February 16, 1996

Signed Pete Myers as a free agent.
 February 22, 1996

Waived Gerald Glass.
 February 23, 1996

Signed Donald Hodge to a 10-day contract.
 March 4, 1996

Released Donald Hodge.

Player Transactions Citation:

References

Charlotte Hornets seasons
Char
Bob
Bob